The Bedourie oven is an Australian adaptation of the camp oven (Dutch oven). Drovers working on Bedourie Station, in western Queensland, found that the heavy cast iron camp ovens they used for cooking would often break as a result of falling from their pack horses. The Bedourie oven was developed in response to this problem.  Formed from mild steel, it is lighter and less brittle than cast iron, and will not break if dropped.

References

 Wannan, Bill. A Dictionary of Australian Folklore: Lore, Legends, Myths, and Traditions (1987). Viking O'Neil. Page 46. 
 Stone, Lionel. "Australia's Food Culture Originated in England." Food in Motion. The Migration of Food Stuffs and Cooking Techniques (1983). Oxford Symposium. Page 110.

Cookware and bakeware
Australian cuisine
Australian inventions
Camping equipment
Cooking vessels